The Story of series is a collection of children's picture books that were written by Ying Chang Compestine and illustrated by Yongsheng Xuan. Each installation depicts the invention of various objects in Chinese culture, including chopsticks, noodles, kites, and paper. An author's note and recipe is included at the end of each book. The first publication of The Story of Chopsticks was printed in English in 2001 by Holiday House. In 2016, the bilingual edition was printed in English and Chinese by Immedium. The illustrations, done by Xuan use traditional Chinese-style cut paper.

The Story of Chopsticks

Plot summary 
In the Story of Chopsticks, each meal is a battle for Kuai as he struggles against his two elder brothers to get to the food. In an act of witty desperation, Kuai uses two sticks to reach for the food that is too hot for his brothers' bare hands and unknowingly starts the tradition of chopsticks. The book concludes with an author's note, instructions for making chopsticks, and a recipe for "Sweet Eight Treasures Rice Pudding".

Character list 
 Pan Kang - Son of Mama and Papa
 Ting Kang - Son of Mama and Papa
 Kùai Kang - Son of Mama and Papa
 Mama - Mother of Pan, Ting, and Kùai
 Papa - Father of Pan, Ting, and Kùai
 Mr. Wang - Friend of the Kangs
 Mr. Lee -  Village wiseman

The Story of Noodles

Plot summary 
The Kang brothers ruin the dumpling ingredients their mother was going to use for the village cooking contest. Instead, they accidentally invent noodles. The book concludes with an author's note and a recipe for "Long Life Noodles".

Character list 
 Mama - Mother of Pan, Ting, and Kùai
 Pan Kang - Son of Mama and Papa
 Ting Kang - Son of Mama and Papa
 Kùai Kang - Son of Mama and Papa
 Papa - Father of Pan, Ting, and Kùai
 Aunt Lee - Competitor in dumpling contest
 Scholar - Judge in dumpling contest
 Chef - Judge in dumpling contest
 Matchmaker - Judge in dumpling contest

The Story of Kites

Plot summary 
In the Story of Kites, the three Kang brothers bang pots and pans together in an attempt to chase birds from the rice fields. After that fails, they decide to make man-made wings out of chopsticks, feathers, and their math homework. The book has been published in English and Chinese. It concludes with an author's note and instructions on how to make a kite.

Character list 
 Ting Kang - Son of Mama and Papa
 Pan Kand - Son of Mama and Papa
 Kùai Kand - Son of Mama and Papa
 Mama - Mother of Pan, Ting, and Kùai
 Papa - Father of Pan, Ting, and Kùai
 Villagers

The Story of Paper

Plot summary 
Long ago, before paper was invented in China, people wrote on their hands or the ground. In the Story of Paper, the naughty Kang brothers get in trouble at school and the teacher leaves a note on their hands for the whole village to see. To avoid embarrassment, the Kang brothers decide to invent something to hide the note from the villagers and their parents. The book concludes with an author's note and instructions for making "Homemade Garden Paper".

Character list 
 Pan Kang - Son of Mama and Papa
 Ting Kang - Son of Mama and Papa
 Kùai Kang - Son of Mama and Papa
 Mama - Mother of Pan, Ting, and Kùai
 Papa - Father of Pan, Ting, and Kùai
 Teacher - Pan, Ting, and Kùai's teacher

References 

2000s books
American children's book series
2001 children's books
Children's fiction books
Picture books by Ying Chang Compestine
Children's books about China
American picture books
2002 children's books
2003 children's books
Works set in Imperial China
Chinese inventions